Rara tech is an electronic music subgenre that fuses the Afro-Haitian genre rara with house music. Haitian-style electronic dance music (EDM) in Haiti is often referred to as "HEDM" (Haitian electronic dance music). The origins of the genre and term was pioneered by Haitian artist, music producer, and DJ, Gardy Girault.

References

21st-century music genres
Haitian styles of music
Genres
Electronic dance music genres